Old Georgians Hockey Club (OGHC) is an English field hockey club based in Addlestone, Surrey. The club was founded in 1995 and the men's team are the current English champions. The club currently has six men's teams (including 2 veterans team) and four ladies teams. The junior section is the OGHC Dragons.

History
In 2019 the men's first team won the Hockey League Conference East and subsequent promotion play off tournament to earn promotion to the 2019-20 Premier Division. This is the first time in the club's history that they played in the elite (tier one) division of the Men's England Hockey League.

The men's first team secured their first ever Premier Division title (with two games to spare) when winning the 2021–22 Premier Division. The success continued a remarkable rise in English hockey because the team had only been promoted into the league at the start of 2019. The teams then went on to secure a league and cup double after winning the 2022 England Hockey Men's Championship Cup.

Players

Men's First Team Squad 2021–22 season

 

 (captain)

Major National Honours
National Champions
 2021–22 Men's League Champions
Tier 1 Cup winners
 2021–22 Men's Cup winners

Notable players

Men's internationals

References

External links
Official website

English field hockey clubs
Sport in Surrey
Weybridge, Surrey
Field hockey clubs established in 1995